IEEE 802.11ad is an amendment to the IEEE 802.11 wireless networking standard, developed to provide a Multiple Gigabit Wireless System (MGWS) standard at 60 GHz frequency, and is a networking standard for WiGig networks. Because it uses the V band of millimeter wave (mmW) frequency, the range of IEEE 802.11ad communication would be rather limited (just a few meters and difficult to pass through obstacles/walls) compared to other conventional Wi-Fi systems. However, the high frequency allows it to use more bandwidth which in turn enables the transmission of data at high data rates up to multiple gigabits per second, enabling usage scenarios like transmission of uncompressed UHD video over the wireless network.

The WiGig standard is not too well known, although it was announced in 2009 and added to the IEEE 802.11 family in December 2012.

After revision, the 60 GHz band covers the frequency of 57 to 71 GHz. The frequency band is subdivided into 6 (previously 4) different channels in IEEE 802.11ad, each of them occupy 2160 MHz of space and provide 1760 MHz of bandwidth.

Some of these frequencies might not be available  for the use of IEEE 802.11ad networks around the world (reserved for other purposes or requires licenses). Below is a list of available unlicensed spectrums for IEEE 802.11ad in different parts of the world:

See also 
 Wireless Gigabit Alliance
 IEEE 802.11ay

References

External links 

IEEE 802.11ad Tutorial
IEEE 802.11ad White Paper
IEEE Std 802.11ad access entry page

ad
Wireless networking